Justin Murphy (born 24 April 1976) is a former Australian rules footballer who played with four clubs during his AFL career.

Early life
Murphy was raised in Victoria, and is of Indigenous Australian descent.  He attended John Gardiner Secondary College and played junior Australian football with the Central Dragons.

AFL career
Murphy is a true journeyman of the AFL, playing his 185 games at four different clubs.

He is remembered as the player who was holding the ball in his hands when the final siren sounded in Carlton's upset 1-point win against Essendon in the 1999 Preliminary Final.

He was involved in the infamous “Line in the Sand” match while playing for Essendon in 2004 and was the only Essendon player to be handed a match suspension after the game.

Murphy announced his retirement after he was delisted by Essendon after the conclusion of the 2005 AFL Season.

Post-AFL career
In 2006, Murphy joined the Heidelberg Football Club in Melbourne's Diamond Valley Football League (later known as the Northern Football League). He played six seasons with the Tigers, in which time he played more than 100 games and won four Premierships.

In 2012, he played for the Tatura Football Club in the Goulburn Valley Football League, winning a premiership there; he played for Numurkah in the Murray Football League in early 2013, and returned to Heidelberg in late 2013, then moved to Knox in the Eastern Football League in 2014. Murphy has also played summer seasons in the Northern Territory Football League with Waratah.

Criminal convictions 
In 2008, Murphy was convicted of stealing a woman's purse as it lay unattended on the counter of a Williamstown bank. It was also reported that he failed to pay an ordered $400 donation to a Black Saturday bushfire appeal that was part of his penalty for the theft.

In 2010, Murphy was arrested when police found two bags of crystal methamphetamine in his car. After initially telling police the drugs were his, in court his lawyer claimed he had been claiming to protect his wife. Murphy pleaded guilty to one charge of possession of a drug of dependence and was released without charge on a 12-month good behavior bond. His lawyer also made an unsuccessful bid to suppress the details of the charge.

In 2017, Murphy was sentenced to 6 months in prison after pleading guilty to 28 charges, including unlawful assault, aggravated burglary and making threats to kill. The charges related to a series of attacks on his former partner, Jill Scott, one of which involved him holding her down and burning her finger with a blowtorch. As a result of her injuries, she had to have her finger amputated. Murphy blamed his actions on his addiction to the drugs meth and GHB.

References

External links

Carlton Football Club players
Richmond Football Club players
Essendon Football Club players
Geelong Football Club players
Indigenous Australian players of Australian rules football
1976 births
Living people
Australian rules footballers from Victoria (Australia)
Sandringham Dragons players
Heidelberg Football Club players
Waratah Football Club players
De La Salle OC Amateur Football Club players
Numurkah Football Club players
Preston Football Club (VFA) players
Bendigo Football Club players
Tatura Football Club players
21st-century Australian criminals
Australian rules footballers from Launceston, Tasmania